Lobal Orning was a record and book store located in the mountains north of the Pacific Coast Highway in the small community of Topanga, California, United States.

It sold a selection of music and books, from classic literature to pulp. The store was described by local press as "one of Topanga’s unfortunately best-kept secrets".

The store was run by rock musician Justin Chancellor of the band Tool, and his wife Shelee Dykman, who coined the phrase "lobal orning" which meant "to decorate the mind", in the sense of ornamenting the lobes of the brain. The store closed March 1, 2008.

References

Bookstores in California
Topanga, California
Independent bookstores of the United States
Buildings and structures in Los Angeles County, California
Music retailers of the United States
Retail buildings in California
Tool (band)
Retail companies established in 2003
Retail companies disestablished in 2008
2003 establishments in California
2009 disestablishments in California